John Vaughan Wright (born 31 December 1935) is a former English cricketer. Wright was a right-handed batsman. He was born at Colchester, Essex.

Wright made his first-class debut for Essex in the 1962 County Championship against Northamptonshire. He played one further first-class match during that season against Warwickshire, before playing 2 further first-class matches in 1967 against Middlesex and the touring Pakistanis. In his 4 first-class matches he scored 60 runs at a batting average of 10.00, with a high score of 40. In the field he took two catches.

References

External links

1935 births
Living people
Sportspeople from Colchester
English cricketers
Essex cricketers